De steile helling (The Steep Slope) is a novel by Dutch author Maarten 't Hart. It was first published in 1988.

Novels by Maarten 't Hart
1988 novels